Peißenberg station is a railway station in the municipality of Peißenberg, in Bavaria, Germany. It is located at junction of the Schongau–Peißenberg and Weilheim–Peißenberg lines of Deutsche Bahn.

Services
 the following services stop at Peißenberg:

References

External links
 
 Peißenberg layout 
 

Railway stations in Bavaria
Buildings and structures in Weilheim-Schongau
Railway stations in Germany opened in 1875